Karang Bolong Beach (Indonesian for "Holed Coral") is a white-sand beach on the island of Nusa Kambangan in Cilacap Regency, Central Java. Located on the eastern end of the island inside a nature reserve, the beach is situated near an old Dutch fortress, also known as Karang Bolong.

Location and access
Karang Bolong Beach is located on Nusa Kambangan Island, which is administratively part of Cilacap Regency, Central Java.

To access Karang Bolong Beach, visitors must rent a boat from Teluk Penyu Beach, south of the city of Cilacap, and cross the Segara Anakan Strait to arrive at a small dock (the Karang Bolong Dock) on the north-eastern part of the island. From there, visitors can take a  trek along a dirt path through the forest; a transport is also available. Near the Karang Bolong fortress, the path splits in two. A left turn, to the north, leads to the western edge of the beach, a small stretch of land on the north of the island. Continuing straight, through the Fortress, leads to the larger stretch, on the eastern edge of the island.

The island of Nusa Kambangan is a nature reserve though people have begun to take up residence near Karang Bolong to cater to visitors.

Facilities
On the path between the western and eastern portions of the beach is a fortress, known as Karang Bolong. This fortress was built by the Dutch colonial forces in about 1873, and was given its Indonesian name for its location close to the beach. Many of its artefacts have been stolen, though cannons can still be found.

Near the western edge of the beach is a waterfall, known as Grojogan Sewu. It is so named because it consists of a thousand short drops.

No lodgings are available at the beach; visitors must return to Cilacap for accommodations.

History

The island of Nusa Kambangan was first used as a prison during the Dutch colonial period. In 1905 it was declared a restricted area and closed to the public. The island remained restricted, under the Dutch colonial and, later, the independent Indonesian government, until 1996, when the governor of Central Java and the Minister of Law signed a memorandum which opened the eastern end of the island to the public. This included many beaches, such as  Karang Bolong.

Several journalists have written that Karang Bolong, as with much of the natural beauty of Nusa Kambangan, is overshadowed by the well-known prison located on the island. Ujang Sarwono, writing for the Surabaya edition of Tribun, considers the relative lack of visitors to the beach to contribute to its pristine shape.

References

Works cited

External links

Beaches of Central Java
Tourist attractions in Central Java
Cilacap Regency
Landforms of Java